Dichter, the German and Dutch words for poet, may refer to:

 Avi Dichter (born 1952), Israeli politician
 Ernest Dichter (1907–1991), American psychologist
 Kenny Dichter, American businessman
 Misha Dichter (born 1945), American classical pianist
 Wilhelm Dichter (born 1935), Polish-born American author

See also 
 Dichter des Vaderlands, an unofficial title for the Poet laureate of the Netherlands
 Dichter und Bauer (Poet and Peasant), an 1846 operetta by Franz von Suppé